The German Empire consisted of 25 constituent states, the largest of which was Prussia, and the Imperial Territory of Alsace-Lorraine. These states, or Staaten (or Bundesstaaten, i.e. federal states, a name derived from the previous North German Confederation; they became known as Länder during the Weimar Republic) each had votes in the Bundesrat, which gave them representation at a federal level.

Several of these states had gained sovereignty following the dissolution of the Holy Roman Empire. Others were created as sovereign states after the Congress of Vienna in 1815. Territories were not necessarily contiguous, such as Bavaria, or Oldenburg—many existed in several parts (enclaves and exclaves), as a result of historical acquisitions, or, in several cases, divisions of the ruling family trees.

Kingdoms

Kingdom of Bavaria
Kingdom of Prussia (itself subdivided into provinces; including the Duchy of Saxe-Lauenburg ruled in personal union until annexed 1 July 1876)
Kingdom of Saxony
Kingdom of Württemberg

Grand Duchies
Grand Duchy of Baden
Grand Duchy of Hesse
Grand Duchy of Mecklenburg-Schwerin
Grand Duchy of Mecklenburg-Strelitz
Grand Duchy of Oldenburg
Grand Duchy of Saxe-Weimar-Eisenach (officially the Grand Duchy of Saxony from 1903)

Duchies

Duchy of Anhalt
Duchy of Brunswick
Duchy of Saxe-Altenburg
Duchy of Saxe-Coburg and Gotha
Duchy of Saxe-Lauenburg (till 1876)
Duchy of Saxe-Meiningen

Principalities
Principality of Lippe-Detmold
Principality of Reuss-Gera (Junior Line)
Principality of Reuss-Greiz (Senior Line)
Principality of Schaumburg-Lippe
Principality of Schwarzburg-Rudolstadt
Principality of Schwarzburg-Sondershausen
Principality of Waldeck and Pyrmont

Free and Hanseatic Cities
Different from the above-mentioned monarchies these city-states were constitutionally organised as republics.
Free Hanseatic City of Bremen
Free and Hanseatic City of Hamburg
Free and Hanseatic City of Lübeck

Imperial Territory
Different from all other aforementioned constituent states, this region, comprising territory ceded by France in 1871 after the Franco-Prussian War, was first administered directly by the central government, but was granted limited autonomy in 1911 with an elected state parliament of its own.
Alsace-Lorraine

See also
Provinces of Prussia
States of the German Confederation
List of German monarchs in 1918
States of the Weimar Republic
Administrative divisions of Nazi Germany
Administrative divisions of East Germany
States of Germany

 
German Empire
Lists of subdivisions of Germany
German Empire
German Empire-related lists
Germany geography-related lists